The arrondissement of Lille is an arrondissement of France in the Nord department in the Hauts-de-France region. It has 124 communes.

Composition

The communes of the arrondissement of Lille, and their INSEE codes, are:

 Allennes-les-Marais (59005)
 Annœullin (59011)
 Anstaing (59013)
 Armentières (59017)
 Attiches (59022)
 Aubers (59025)
 Avelin (59034)
 Bachy (59042)
 Baisieux (59044)
 La Bassée (59051)
 Bauvin (59052)
 Beaucamps-Ligny (59056)
 Bersée (59071)
 Bois-Grenier (59088)
 Bondues (59090)
 Bourghelles (59096)
 Bousbecque (59098)
 Bouvines (59106)
 Camphin-en-Carembault (59123)
 Camphin-en-Pévèle (59124)
 Capinghem (59128)
 Cappelle-en-Pévèle (59129)
 Carnin (59133)
 La Chapelle-d'Armentières (59143)
 Chemy (59145)
 Chéreng (59146)
 Cobrieux (59150)
 Comines (59152)
 Croix (59163)
 Cysoing (59168)
 Deûlémont (59173)
 Don (59670)
 Emmerin (59193)
 Englos (59195)
 Ennetières-en-Weppes (59196)
 Ennevelin (59197)
 Erquinghem-le-Sec (59201)
 Erquinghem-Lys (59202)
 Escobecques (59208)
 Faches-Thumesnil (59220)
 Forest-sur-Marque (59247)
 Fournes-en-Weppes (59250)
 Frelinghien (59252)
 Fretin (59256)
 Fromelles (59257)
 Genech (59258)
 Gondecourt (59266)
 Gruson (59275)
 Hallennes-lez-Haubourdin (59278)
 Halluin (59279)
 Hantay (59281)
 Haubourdin (59286)
 Hem (59299)
 Herlies (59303)
 Herrin (59304)
 Houplin-Ancoisne (59316)
 Houplines (59317)
 Illies (59320)
 Lambersart (59328)
 Lannoy (59332)
 Leers (59339)
 Lesquin (59343)
 Lezennes (59346)
 Lille (59350)
 Linselles (59352)
 Lompret (59356)
 Loos (59360)
 Louvil (59364)
 Lys-lez-Lannoy (59367)
 La Madeleine (59368)
 Le Maisnil (59371)
 Marcq-en-Barœul (59378)
 Marquette-lez-Lille (59386)
 Marquillies (59388)
 Mérignies (59398)
 Moncheaux (59408)
 Mons-en-Barœul (59410)
 Mons-en-Pévèle (59411)
 Mouchin (59419)
 Mouvaux (59421)
 La Neuville (59427)
 Neuville-en-Ferrain (59426)
 Noyelles-lès-Seclin (59437)
 Ostricourt (59452)
 Pérenchies (59457)
 Péronne-en-Mélantois (59458)
 Phalempin (59462)
 Pont-à-Marcq (59466)
 Prémesques (59470)
 Provin (59477)
 Quesnoy-sur-Deûle (59482)
 Radinghem-en-Weppes (59487)
 Ronchin (59507)
 Roncq (59508)
 Roubaix (59512)
 Sailly-lez-Lannoy (59522)
 Sainghin-en-Mélantois (59523)
 Sainghin-en-Weppes (59524)
 Saint-André-lez-Lille (59527)
 Salomé (59550)
 Santes (59553)
 Seclin (59560)
 Sequedin (59566)
 Templemars (59585)
 Templeuve-en-Pévèle (59586)
 Thumeries (59592)
 Toufflers (59598)
 Tourcoing (59599)
 Tourmignies (59600)
 Tressin (59602)
 Vendeville (59609)
 Verlinghem (59611)
 Villeneuve-d'Ascq (59009)
 Wahagnies (59630)
 Wambrechies (59636)
 Wannehain (59638)
 Warneton (59643)
 Wasquehal (59646)
 Wattignies (59648)
 Wattrelos (59650)
 Wavrin (59653)
 Wervicq-Sud (59656)
 Wicres (59658)
 Willems (59660)

History

The arrondissement of Lille was created in 1800.

As a result of the reorganisation of the cantons of France which came into effect in 2015, the borders of the cantons are no longer related to the borders of the arrondissements. The cantons of the arrondissement of Lille were, as of January 2015:

 Armentières
 La Bassée
 Cysoing
 Haubourdin
 Lannoy
 Lille-Centre
 Lille-Est
 Lille-Nord
 Lille-Nord-Est
 Lille-Ouest
 Lille-Sud
 Lille-Sud-Est
 Lille-Sud-Ouest
 Lomme
 Marcq-en-Barœul
 Pont-à-Marcq
 Quesnoy-sur-Deûle
 Roubaix-Centre
 Roubaix-Est
 Roubaix-Nord
 Roubaix-Ouest
 Seclin-Nord
 Seclin-Sud
 Tourcoing-Nord
 Tourcoing-Nord-Est
 Tourcoing-Sud
 Villeneuve-d'Ascq-Nord
 Villeneuve-d'Ascq-Sud

References

 
Lille
French Flanders